Oryzihumus leptocrescens is a Gram-positive bacterium species from the genus of Oryzihumus which has been isolated from soil from Japan.

References 

Intrasporangiaceae
Bacteria described in 2005